Mürzzuschlag is a town in northeastern Styria, Austria, the capital of the former Mürzzuschlag District. The population is 8,684 (1 January 2016). Originally an industrial area, the nearby mountains are today a popular ski resort.

History
The settlement in the Duchy of Styria was first documented in 1227. The minnesinger Ulrich von Liechtenstein in his 1265 poem Frauendienst mentioned Murzuslage, which he passed on his journey from Venice to Vienna. In 1360 the Habsburg duke Rudolf IV confirmed the inhabitants' privilege of iron production, competing with the town of Leoben.

In 1854 the Semmering railway opened, by which the Austrian Southern Railway company provided direct access to Vienna, largely promoting the local economy. The Bleckmann steel mill was founded in 1862, it is today part of Böhler-Uddeholm. 
A railway museum exhibits a collection of steam locomotives, associated equipment and rolling stock.

In the late 19th century, the mountainous Semmering area was the site of the first alpine skiing attempts in Central Europe, which made it one of the oldest ski resorts of Austria, documented by the world's largest skiing and winter sports museum. Mürzzuschlag received town privileges in 1923.

1931 Workers' Olympiad
On February 5–8, 1931 the second winter Workers' Olympiad organised by the Socialist Workers' Sport International was held in the town. The games were larger (both in number of participants and spectators) than the 1932 Winter Olympics held in Lake Placid, New York, United States.

Population

Twin towns — sister cities

Mürzzuschlag is twinned with:
 Arusha, Tanzania
 Blansko, Czech Republic
 Chillán, Chile

Personalities
Viktor Kaplan (1876–1934), engineer and inventor of the Kaplan turbine
Johannes Brahms (1833-1897) during his 1884 and 1885 summer vacations in Mürzzuschlag wrote his Symphony No. 4, commemorated by a Brahms museum
Elfriede Jelinek (born 1946), playwright and novelist, 2004 Nobel laureate
 Jenny Jugo (1904-2001), Actress
Claudio Arrau (1903 - 1991), chilean pianist, lived his last years in Mürzzuschlag before passing away in 1991

References

External links 
Welcome to Mürzzuschlag.
Pictures of Mürzzuschlag

 
Fischbach Alps
Cities and towns in Bruck-Mürzzuschlag District